Symington may refer to:

People
Symington (surname)
Symington family (United States), a family of politicians from the United States

Places
Symington, South Lanarkshire, village in Scotland, one of three named after Simon de Lockart
Symington railway station, served the village of Symington in Scotland between 1848 and 1965
Symington, South Ayrshire, village in Scotland. Named after Simon de Lockart
Symington, Scottish Borders, village in Scotland, now just a small hamlet, also named after Simon de Lockart
Symington Islands, in the Antarctic
Symington House, located in Newark, Essex County, New Jersey, United States
Symington Yard, the largest of Canadian National Railway's rail classification yard in Canada

Other uses
Symington Family Estates, major Port wine company
Symington Amendment, legislation to strengthen the US position on nuclear non-proliferation